The 1998 Sacramento State Hornets football team represented California State University, Sacramento as a member of the Big Sky Conference during the 1998 NCAA Division I-AA football season. Led by fourth-year head coach John Volek, Sacramento State compiled an overall record of 5–6 with a mark of 3–5 in conference play, tying for seventh place in the Big Sky. The team was outscored by its opponents 300 to 289 for the season. The Hornets played home games at Hornet Stadium in Sacramento, California.

Schedule

Team players in the NFL
No Sacramento State players were selected in the 1999 NFL Draft.

The following finished their college career in 1998, were not drafted, but played in the NFL.

References

Sacramento State
Sacramento State Hornets football seasons
Sacramento State Hornets football